The  New York Giants season was the franchise's 15th season in the National Football League.

Schedule

Game Summaries

Week 3: at Philadelphia Eagles

Week 4: at Washington Redskins

Week 5: at Pittsburgh Pirates

Week 6: vs. Philadelphia Eagles

Week 7: vs. Chicago Bears

Week 8: at Brooklyn Dodgers

Week 9: at Detroit Lions

Week 10: vs. Chicago Cardinals

Week 11: vs. Pittsburgh Pirates

Week 12: vs. Brooklyn Dodgers

Week 13: vs. Washington Redskins

Playoffs

NFL Championship Game

Standings

See also
List of New York Giants seasons

References
1939 New York Giants season at Pro Football Reference

New York Giants seasons
New York Giants
New York
1930s in Manhattan
Washington Heights, Manhattan